The Fifteenth Federal Electoral District of the Federal District (XV Distrito Electoral Federal del Distrito Federal) is one of the 300 Electoral Districts into which Mexico is divided for the purpose of elections to the federal Chamber of Deputies and one of 27 such districts in the Federal District ("DF" or Mexico City).

It elects one deputy to the lower house of Congress for each three-year legislative period, by means of the first past the post system.

District territory
Under the 2005 districting scheme, the DF's Fifteenth District covers the whole of the borough (delegación) of Benito Juárez.

Previous districting schemes

1996–2005 district
Between 1996 and 2005, the 15th District covered all of the borough of Benito Juárez, with the exception of its easternmost fringe.

Deputies returned to Congress from this district

XLIV Legislature
 1958–1961: Juan José Osorio Palacios (PRI)
XLV Legislature
 1961–1964:
XLVI Legislature
 1964–1967:
XLVII Legislature
 1967–1970:
XLVIII Legislature
 1970–1973:
XLIX Legislature
 1973–1976:
L Legislature
 1976–1979: Juan José Osorio Palacios (PRI)
LI Legislature
 1979–1982: José Herrera Arango (PRI)
LII Legislature
 1982–1985: Juan José Osorio Palacios (PRI)
LIII Legislature
 1985–1988:
LIV Legislature
 1988–1991:
LV Legislature
 1991–1994:
LVI Legislature
 1994–1997: Javier Pineda y Serino (PRI)
LVII Legislature
 1997–2000: José Espina (PAN)
LVIII Legislature
 2000–2003: José Manuel Minjares Jiménez (PAN)
LIX Legislature
 2003–2006: Federico Döring (PAN)
LX Legislature
 2006–2007: José Manuel Minjares Jiménez (PAN)
 2007–2009: Rosaura Virginia Denegre Vaught (PAN)

References and notes

Federal electoral districts of Mexico
Mexico City